The Grand Prix Bradlo was a cycling race held annually in Slovakia. It was part of UCI Europe Tour in category 2.2.

Winners

References

Cycle races in Slovakia
Recurring sporting events established in 2000
Recurring sporting events disestablished in 2009
2000 establishments in Slovakia
UCI Europe Tour races
Defunct cycling races in Slovakia